Synogdoa is a genus of moths in the subfamily Lymantriinae. The genus was erected by Per Olof Christopher Aurivillius in 1904.

Species
Synogdoa burgessi Collenette, 1957 Uganda
Synogdoa chionobosca (Collenette, 1960) Uganda
Synogdoa miltophleba (Collenette, 1960) Congo
Synogdoa nesiotica (Collenette, 1933) Uganda
Synogdoa simplex Aurivillius, 1904 western Africa

References

Lymantriinae
Moth genera
Taxa named by Jacob Hübner